Exotica is a musical genre, named after the 1957 Martin Denny album of the same name that was popular during the 1950s to mid-1960s with Americans who came of age during World War II. The term was coined by Simon "Si" Waronker, Liberty Records co-founder board chairman. The musical colloquialism exotica means tropical ersatz, the non-native, pseudo experience of insular Oceania, Southeast Asia, Hawaii, the Amazon basin, the Andes, the Caribbean and tribal Africa. Denny described the musical style as "a combination of the South Pacific and the Orient...what a lot of people imagined the islands to be like...it's pure fantasy though." While the South Seas forms the core region, exotica reflects the "musical impressions" of every place from standard travel destinations to the mythical "shangri-las" dreamt of by armchair safari-ers.

History

Les Baxter's album Ritual of the Savage (Le Sacre du Sauvage) was released in 1952 and would become a cornerstone of exotica. This album featured lush orchestral arrangements along with tribal rhythms and offered such classics as "Quiet Village", "Jungle River Boat", "Love Dance", and "Stone God." Ritual is the seminal exotica record, influencing all that came after it. As the 1950s progressed, Baxter carved out a niche in this area, producing a number of titles in this style including Tamboo! (1956), Caribbean Moonlight (1956), Ports of Pleasure (1957), The Sacred Idol (1960) and Jewels of the Sea (1961).  Baxter claimed Ravel and Stravinsky as influences on his work.

In 1957, Martin Denny covered Les Baxter's "Quiet Village", with exotic bird calls and a vibraphone instead of strings, which established the sound of the Polynesian styled music. The song reached #2 on Billboard's charts in 1959 with Denny's Exotica album reaching #1. Soon the new technology of stereo further opened up the musical palettes of Denny and other prominent exotica artists such as Arthur Lyman and Juan García Esquivel.

The distinctive sound of exotica relies on a variety of instruments: conga, bongos, vibes, Indonesian and Burmese gongs, boo bams (bamboo sticks), Tahitian log, Chinese bell tree, and Japanese kotos. Additionally intrinsic to the sound of exotica are bird calls, big-cat roars, and even primate shrieks, which invoke the dangers of the jungle. Though there are some standards which contain lyrics, singing is rare. Abstract, siren-like ululations, chants, vocalized animal calls, and guttural growls are common.

The music of American composer Raymond Scott is sometimes recognized as a precursor to exotica, as several of his songs were written with the intent of transporting the listener to exotic locations via novelty instruments and sound effects.

As a result of the popularity of exotica during the late 1950s, a large number of records were released that featured covers of recently released exotica songs (mainly by Les Baxter) and Hawaiian and easy-listening standards. These recordings include "Exotica" by Ted Auletta, "Exotic Percussion" by Stanley Black and his Orchestra, "Orienta" by Gerald Fried, "Taboo" and "Taboo 2" by Arthur Lyman and "The Sounds of Exotic Island" by The Surfmen.  Some composers pushed the bounds of the genre by producing albums of original content, often with unusual instrumentation. These recordings include Voodoo by Robert Drasnin, Africana by Chaino, Pagan Festival by Dominic Frontiere And His Orchestra, and White Goddess by Frank Hunter.  By 1959, the majority of American record labels had released at least one exotica-themed album, usually utilizing composers and musicians that produced jazz, classical or easy listening recordings.

After several years of rising excitement leading up to Hawaii becoming a state in 1959, the Hawaiiana fad waned in the United States and so did exotica's commercial appeal. CD re-issues ignited a revival in the early 1990s.

Revival
In 1971 Roger Roger and Nino Nardini released the album Jungle Obsession on the French Neuilly record label. Intended as a sound library recording, it soon took on a life of its own. Although clearly influenced by the exotica arrangements of Baxter, Martin Denny, Frank Hunter and Dick Hyman, it went beyond the simpler themes used by those composers to employ "a series of motifs, leitmotifs, and modes that were out of the musical sphere at the time: they took rock and classical and bossa and jazz and easy listening, wove them together with polyrhythmic invention and a boatload of sound effects".

In the 1990s exotica resurfaced more generally, along with a new category in which to place the genre: lounge. Dozens of long out-of-print LPs were reissued on CD. The revival accompanied a related swing revival and general appreciation for tiki culture. A new crop of bands, such as Pink Martini, were influenced by the classic albums, and Combustible Edison for one featured songs like "Breakfast at Denny's", a tongue-in-cheek title for a song styled on the music of Martin Denny.

The early 2000s saw additional exotica revival efforts, such as Hawaii-based Don Tiki, the comeback of 1960s composer Robert Drasnin, Waitiki, The Stolen Idols, Kava Kon, and a group consisting of international exotica musicians called Tiki Joe's Ocean, formed by lifelong instrumentalist Andy Nazzal. As of 2008, there are many festivals worldwide that celebrate exotica music and the tiki culture.

There are several podcasts that broadcast classic and new exotica and tiki revival music.

See also
World music
Worldbeat

References

 
Tiki culture
World music genres
North American music